Dean Hall (born November 16, 1957, in Palo Alto, California), is a former driver in the CART Championship Car series.  He raced in the 1990, 1991 and 1995 seasons with 21 career starts, including the 1990 Indianapolis 500.  His best CART finish was in 11th position at the 1990 Cleveland Budweiser Grand Prix and the 1990 Ohio Red Roof Inns 200.

Before moving to CART, Hall was the 1988 West Coast Formula Atlantic Racing champion and the 1989 Formula Pacific champion.  He also won the 1989 New Zealand Grand Prix while competing in New Zealand Formula Atlantic.

Racing record

American open–wheel racing results
(key)

Indy Lights

CART

Indianapolis 500

References

External links
Driver Database Profile

1957 births
Atlantic Championship drivers
Indianapolis 500 drivers
Indy Lights drivers
Toyota Racing Series drivers
Living people
Sportspeople from Palo Alto, California
Racing drivers from California

Dale Coyne Racing drivers